Bruno de Oliveira Silva (born 6 October 1990) is a former Brazilian footballer.

Career statistics

Club

Notes

References

1990 births
Living people
Brazilian footballers
Brazilian expatriate footballers
Association football forwards
Uruguayan Primera División players
Uruguayan Segunda División players
Central Español players
C.A. Bella Vista players
Centro Atlético Fénix players
Associação Atlética Internacional (Limeira) players
C.A. Progreso players
Expatriate footballers in Uruguay
Brazilian expatriate sportspeople in Uruguay
Sportspeople from Recife